155142 Tenagra is an asteroid in the asteroid belt.

Description 
155142 Tenagra is an asteroid in the asteroid belt. It was discovered by Jean-Claude Merlin on October 26, 2005, at Tenagra II Observatory. It has orbital parameters semimajor axis of 2.76 AU, an orbital eccentricity of 0.084 and orbital inclination of 0.08° with respect to the ecliptic.

It was named after the imaginary place Tenagra, from the Star Trek: The Next Generation episode "Darmok", in which the screenwriter explored the limits of the spirit of cooperation.

References 

155142
Discoveries by Jean-Claude Merlin
Named minor planets
Star Trek
20051026